Heit may refer to:

 Brian Heit, American politician
 Jonathan Morgan Heit (born 2000), American celebrity
 Randy Heit, programmer